Bathwick is an electoral ward in the City of Bath, England, on the opposite bank of the River Avon to the historic city centre.

Bathwick was part of the hundred of Bath Forum.

The district became part of the Bath urban area with the 18th century development of the Pulteney estate and the building of Pulteney Bridge. Subsequently various Georgian streets were built including Sydney Place, Great Pulteney Street and Laura Place, with Bathwick Hill leading up to Claverton Down and the University of Bath.

It is also home to the Holburne Museum of Art within Sydney Gardens, Bath Recreation Ground (The Home of Premiership, Bath Rugby) and The North Parade Ground, the current home to Bath Cricket Club and Bath City’s first ever ground from 1889-1891.

Bathwick has two churches: St John the Baptist, Bathwick and St Mary the Virgin, Bathwick. The latter was built in the early 19th century by John Pinch the Elder, and was where the band Muse recorded the organ sections on their second studio album Origin of Symmetry.

See also
Batman rapist

References

External links
 United Benefice of Bathwick
 A Community Website for Bathwick Hill Residents

Areas of Bath, Somerset
Electoral wards in Bath and North East Somerset